Marghab District  (Persian ولسوالی مرغاب), is a district located in Ghor Province, Afghanistan, created on 26 November 2019. Shorabak area serves as the district center. President Ghani decreed the creation of the district through decree No. 632 from the Presidential Palace. It was the people's demand. The district encompasses 32 villages and around 19,000 people, Marghab District has approximately 40000 inhabitants and is mainly populated by Tajiks. 

Most of the population live in the valley of the Marghab River.

Economy 
The district suffers from poverty and a weak economy.

References

External links 
UNHCR Sub-Office, Herat, District Profile: Chaghcharan

Districts of Ghor Province